Good Grief Moncrieff! is a talk show hosted by Seán Moncrieff. The show aired live on Saturday nights as a summer "filler" between 15 June and 24 August 1996.

References

1996 Irish television series debuts
1996 Irish television series endings
Irish television talk shows
RTÉ original programming